The 2012 Toyota Grand Prix of Long Beach was the third race of the 2012 IndyCar Series season. The race was run on April 15, 2012 in Long Beach, California, United States at Streets of Long Beach.

Report

Background
The first two races of the 2012 IndyCar Series season were held in St. Petersburg and Barber.  The races were dominated by Team Penske with two poles and two wins in a row. In St. Petersburg, Will Power took the pole and Hélio Castroneves won the victory, but at Barber things were reversed. Going into Long Beach, Castroneves led in the drivers' championship with 86 points, while Chevrolet led the manufacturers' championship.

Before the first practice, all Chevrolet entries were penalized because of unauthorized engine changes.  This penalty moved the polesitter, Ryan Briscoe, from starting in the first position down to the 11th spot.  Dario Franchitti, in the quickest non-Chevrolet car, started in the first position.

Classification

Starting grid

Race results

Notes
 Points include 1 point for pole position and 2 points for most laps led.

Standings after the race

Drivers' Championship

Note: Only the top five positions are included for the driver standings.

Manufacturers' Championship

See also
2012 American Le Mans Series at Long Beach

References

Grand Prix of Long Beach
Toyota Grand Prix of Long Beach
Toyota Grand Prix of Long Beach
Toyota Grand Prix of Long Beach